

Western Kangaroo Island Marine Park (formerly Western Kangaroo Island Commonwealth Marine Reserve) is a marine protected area located south of South Australia in waters within the Australian Exclusive economic zone to the south-west of Kangaroo Island and ranging in depth from  to . 

It was gazetted in November 2012.  It was renamed on 11 October 2017.

It is part of a group of Australian marine parks managed by the Department of the Environment  and Energy known as the South-west Marine Parks Network.  It adjoins the Western Kangaroo Island Marine Park managed by the Government of South Australia which it both bounds on its north-west side and fully encloses the portion of the state marine park surrounding Lipson Reef near its eastern extent.  

See also
 Protected areas managed by the Australian government

References

External links
Official webpage
Webpage for the Western Kangaroo Island Commonwealth Marine Reserve on the Protected Planet website

IUCN Category II
IUCN Category VI
Australian marine parks
Protected areas established in 2012
2012 establishments in Australia